Tovma Artsruni (also known in English-language historiography as Thomas Artsruni; precise birth date and date of death unknown) was a ninth-century to tenth-century Armenian historian and author of the History of the House of Artsrunik. Contrary to the given title, the four-volume work not only relates the history of Artsruni royal family, of which he was a member of, and its origins near Lake Van but also comprehensively covers the history of Armenia.

History of the House of Artsrunik
Tovma began writing History sometime in the 870s. Much like other histories composed by Armenian historians, the first volume starts at the beginning of the Armenian nation and ends in the middle of the fifth century. However, Tovma's most valuable contributions are found in the second and third volumes which accurately detail Armenian life under the rule of the Arab Caliphates and in particular the 851 Arab military expedition led by the Turkic general Bugha al-Kabir, its subsequent consequences, and the establishment of the independent Bagratid state north of Lake Van. Tovma was a relative of the king of Vaspurakan Gagik I, and wrote a detailed account in History about the famous palace and church Gagik constructed on Akhtamar Island.

The precise date that Tovma completed his work is unknown although some historians have determined that it was composed sometime after 905. Tovma's work ends with an incomplete 29th chapter yet several unknown authors (referred to as "Anonymous") took it upon themselves to continue History down to the 1370s and added an appendix and colophon. Tovma's History was first published in 1852 in Constantinople in Armenian and was subsequently translated into French by Marie-Félicité Brosset in 1862.

References

Further reading
Thomas Artsruni. History of the House of Artsrunik. Trans. and edited by Robert W. Thomson. Detroit:  Wayne State University Press, 1985.

Historians of the Caucasus
9th-century Armenian historians
Thomas
10th-century Armenian historians